The 1998 Grambling State Tigers football team represented Grambling State University as a member of the Southwestern Athletic Conference (SWAC) during the 1998 NCAA Division I-AA football season. The Tigers were led by head coach Doug Williams in his first year and finished the season with a record of five wins and six losses (5–6, 4–4 SWAC). The Tigers offense scored 287 points while the defense allowed only 318 points.

Schedule

Reference:

References

Grambling State
Grambling State Tigers football seasons
Grambling State Tigers football